Andreas Zülow (born 23 October 1965) is a retired amateur boxer from East Germany who won a Lightweight gold medal at the 1988 Summer Olympic Games. He also won the silver medal at the 1989 World Amateur Boxing Championships in Moscow, and the bronze medal at the 1986 World Amateur Boxing Championships in Reno.

Amateur career

Zülow had an outstanding amateur career, compiling a Record of 273 wins in 322 fights.

His highlights include:
East German Featherweight Champion 1984–1986, East German Lightweight Champion 1987–1989, German Light Welterweight Champion 1992
1985 competed as a Featherweight at the European Championships in Budapest, Hungary
Defeated Raymond Gavia (France) PTS (5–0)
Lost to Tomasz Nowak (Poland) PTS (0–5)
1986 3rd place as a Featherweight at the World Championships in Reno, United States.
Defeated Klaus Niketta (West Germany) PTS (5–0)
Defeated Kunle La Costa (Nigeria) RSCH-1
Defeated Bobby McCarthy (Ireland) PTS (5–0)
Lost to Kelcie Banks (USA) PTS (1–4)
1987 competed as a Featherweight at the European Championships in Turin, Italy
Lost to Mikhail Kazaryan (Soviet Union) PTS (1–4)
1988 Lightweight Gold Medalist at the Seoul Olympics representing East Germany
Round of 64: Defeated Patrick Waweru (Kenya) PTS (5–0)
Round of 32: Defeated Giorgio Campanella (Italy) PTS (5–0)
Round of 16: Defeated Konstantin Tszyu (Soviet Union) PTS (3–2)
Quarterfinal: Defeated Mohamed Regazy (Egypt) PTS (5–0)
Semifinal: Defeated Romallis Ellis (USA) PTS (5–0)
Final: Defeated George Cramne (Sweden) PTS (5–0)
1989 2nd place as a Lightweight at the World Championships in Moscow, Soviet Union
Defeated Darrell Hiles (Australia) PTS (24–4)
Defeated Fared Cheklat (France) AB-3
Defeated Konstantin Tszyu (Soviet Union) PTS (17–14)
Lost to Julio Gonzalez (Cuba) PTS (+15-15)
1990 competed as a Lightweight at the Goodwill Games in Seattle, United States
Lost to Mikhail Kazaryan (Soviet Union) PTS (0–5)
1991 competed as a Light Welterweight at the World Championships in Sydney, Australia
Defeated Søren Søndergaard (Denmark) PTS (13–8)
Lost to Peter Richardson (Great Britain) PTS (12–22)
1991 2nd place as a Light Welterweight at the European Championships in Gothenburg, Sweden.
Lost the final to Konstantin Tszyu from the Soviet Union
1992 competed as a Light Welterweight at the Barcelona Olympics representing Germany. Results were:
Defeated Jae-Kyung Kim (South Korea) PTS (12–0)
Lost to Hector Vinent (Cuba) PTS (2–14)
1994 competed as a Light Welterweight at the Goodwill Games in Saint Petersburg, Russia
Lost to Hans Janssen (Netherlands) PTS (3–5)

References

1965 births
Living people
People from Ludwigslust
People from Bezirk Schwerin
German male boxers
Sportspeople from Mecklenburg-Western Pomerania
Lightweight boxers
Light-welterweight boxers
Olympic boxers of East Germany
Olympic boxers of Germany
Boxers at the 1988 Summer Olympics
Boxers at the 1992 Summer Olympics
Olympic medalists in boxing
Olympic gold medalists for East Germany
Medalists at the 1988 Summer Olympics
AIBA World Boxing Championships medalists
Recipients of the Patriotic Order of Merit in gold
Competitors at the 1990 Goodwill Games
Competitors at the 1994 Goodwill Games